Ridin' Thru is a 1934 American Western film directed by Harry S. Webb and starring Tom Tyler, Ruth Hiatt and Lafe McKee.

Cast
 Tom Tyler as Tom Saunders  
 Ruth Hiatt as Dolores Brooks  
 Lafe McKee as Elmer 'Dad' Brooks  
 Philo McCullough as Winthrop  
 Ben Corbett as Barney 
 Lew Meehan as Henchman Joe  
 Bud Osborne as Sheriff
 Jayne Regan as Ranch Guest

References

Bibliography
 Pitts, Michael R. Poverty Row Studios, 1929–1940: An Illustrated History of 55 Independent Film Companies, with a Filmography for Each. McFarland & Company, 2005.

External links
 

1934 films
1934 Western (genre) films
1930s English-language films
American Western (genre) films
Films directed by Harry S. Webb
Reliable Pictures films
American black-and-white films
American action adventure films
1930s action films
1934 adventure films
1930s American films